William Lee Rausch  (born September 10, 1964) is an American drummer who played in several thrash metal bands based in California from 1983 to 1987. He is currently the drummer at a church in Indian Lake, Ohio.

Career

Megadeth
Rausch's career began in 1983 when former Metallica guitarist Dave Mustaine formed his own band called Megadeth. After trying several drummers, Rausch was hired.  This was the first real Megadeth lineup, one that began playing live and recording, and consisted of Rausch, Mustaine, and David Ellefson. In 1984, Megadeth recorded its first demo, Last Rites, consisting of four titles. In the same year, Rausch left the group due to internal conflict and was replaced by Gar Samuelson.

Dark Angel and Wargod
After leaving Megadeth in 1984, Rausch played for another noteworthy thrash metal band in the region, Dark Angel. He played live shows with the band but never recorded anything official with them during his tenure.

In 1986, Rausch joined the group of guitarist Michelle Meldrum, Wargod, replacing Gene Hoglan who had just left the band to join Dark Angel. With Wargod, Rausch recorded a demo that year, but the group split in 1987. Rausch was no longer part of a band, but continues to play from time to time locally in northwestern Ohio.

References

https://bravewords.com/news/bravewords-top-news-stories-of-2021-20-11
https://bravewords.com/news/david-ellefson-looks-back-on-guitarist-kerry-king-leaving-megadeth-for-slayer-he-saw-there-was-an-audience-for-it-and-the-bay-area-was-the-holy-grail

External links
http://www.metal-rules.com/metalnews/2010/12/09/megadeth-%E2%80%93-early-%E2%80%9984-%E2%80%9Crattlehead%E2%80%9D-live-recording/
http://minutohm.com/2014/08/31/discografia-metallica-parte-9-nascimento-do-thrash-metal/discmet_9_10_megadeth-live-19th-february-1984-19-02-84-with-kerry-king/

1964 births
Living people
20th-century American drummers
American male drummers
20th-century American male musicians